Mike Clink is an American record producer. He began his career as an engineer at Record Plant Studios, recording such bands as Whitesnake, Triumph, Guns N' Roses, Mötley Crüe, Megadeth, UFO (including Strangers in the Night), Jefferson Starship, The Babys, Heart, Eddie Money, and many others.

Career
Clink began producing in 1986. "After a series of failed attempts", Steve Kurutz at AllMusic noted, "a young band named Guns N' Roses asked Clink to produce their debut album, Appetite for Destruction." "We could have made it all smooth and polished with (original producer) Spencer Proffer," noted Axl Rose, "[but] it was too fucking radio (i.e., radio-friendly). That's why we went with Mike Clink." Clink's collaboration with Guns N' Roses lasted for five albums, which sold a combined total of around ninety million.

In 1988, Clink began work on Metallica's ...And Justice for All but was replaced with Flemming Rasmussen, who had helmed the band's preceding two albums.

In 1989, Clink produced the Sea Hags' critically acclaimed, self-titled debut album, recorded at Captain and Tennille's Rumbo Recorders. It would be the band's only album. The following year, Clink coproduced the successful Rust in Peace by American thrash metal band Megadeth.

In 1996, Clink moved away from the metal genre to produce an album for the pop punk band Size 14, released on Volcano Entertainment, part of BMG.

Clink recorded and mixed the live half-time show for Super Bowl XXXV that featured Aerosmith, 'N Sync, Nelly, and Britney Spears. He also recorded and mixed a live television special for Union Underground. In 2001, he produced the album Glamorous Youth for the Houston rock band Pure Rubbish, signed to Ozzy Osbourne's label, Divine Recordings.

An entrepreneur, Clink frequently speaks on panels focusing on digital rights, new media technology, and copyright protection.

Selected discography

As producer
{| class="wikitable sortable" border="1"
|-
! Artist
! Album name
! Year
|-
|Triumph
|The Sport of Kings
|1986
|-
|Survivor
|When Seconds Count
|1986
|-
|Guns N' Roses
|Appetite for Destruction
|1987
|-
|Hurricane
|Over the Edge
|1988
|-
|Guns N' Roses
|Lies
|1988
|-
|Whitesnake
|Slip of the Tongue
|1989
|-
|Sea Hags
|Sea Hags
|1989
|-
|Little Caesar
|Street Survivors
|1989
|-
|Megadeth
|Rust in Peace
|1990
|-
|Guns N' Roses
|Use Your Illusion I
|1991
|-
|Guns N' Roses
|Use Your Illusion II
|1991
|-
|Roxy Blue
|Want Some?
|1992
|-
|Guns N' Roses
|"The Spaghetti Incident?"
|1993
|-
|I Mother Earth
|Dig
|1993
|-
|Slash
|"Magic Carpet Ride" from Coneheads
|1993
|-
|Sammy Hagar
|(Un)boxed
|1994
|-
|Guns N' Roses
|"Sympathy for the Devil" from Interview with the Vampire
|1994
|-
|Slash
|It's Five O'Clock Somewhere
|1995
|-
|Beth Hart Band
|Immortal
|1996
|-
|Sammy Hagar
|Marching to Mars
|1997
|-
|Size 14
|Size 14
|1997
|-
|Fuzzbubble
|"Out There" from Godzilla: The Album
|1998
|-
|Fuzzbubble
|"Bliss" from the Hell City, Hell soundtrack
|1998
|-
|Pushmonkey
|Pushmonkey
|1998
|-
|Mötley Crüe|New Tattoo|2000
|-
|Pushmonkey
|El Bitche|2001
|-
|Pure Rubbish
|Glamorous Youth|2001
|-
|Steve Vai
|The Infinite Steve Vai: An Anthology 
|2003
|-
|The Glitterati
|The Glitterati|2005
|-
|Camp Freddy
|"The Jean Genie"
|2006
|-
|Warner Drive
|Fully Loaded|2006
|-
|Crushed
|My Machine|2006
|-
|Sarah Kelly
|Where the Past Meets Today|2006
|-
|Brad Cox
|New Directions|2008
|-
|Crushed
|Shadows and Substance|2008
|-
|Camp Freddy
|"Merry Xmas Everybody"
|2008
|-
|The Sonic Graffiti
|"Mystery Number" from The Haiti Project|2010
|-
|State Line Empire
|Octane EP
|2011
|-
|Mumiy Troll
|Vladivostok|2012
|-
|Shelter Dogs
|Take Me Home|2014
|-
|Archer
|Culling the Weak|2015
|-
|Jaime Wyatt
|Felony Blues|2017
|-
|Lucie
|"Nejlepší, kterou znám" from EvoLucie|2018
|-
|Les Stroud
|Bittern Lake|2018
|-
|American Bombshell
|"My Drug" from Tattooed 'N Bruised|2019
|-
|Les Stroud
|Mother Earth|2019
|-
|Archer Nation
|Beneath the Dream|2019
|-
|Capital Theatre
|A Hero's Journey|2021
|-
|Triumph tribute
|(forthcoming album)
|2021
|}

As engineer

Awards and nominations
Several of Clink's productions and recordings have received awards and nominations, including Lucie's single "Nejlepší, kterou znám", from the album EvoLucie''. Both the single and the album won Anděl Awards, for Song of the Year and Album of the Year, respectively.

References

External links
 
 Mike Clink at McDonough Management
 Biography at Shure.com (archived)

American record producers
Living people
Year of birth missing (living people)